Daemosan Station is a station on the Bundang Line, a commuter rail service of Korail.

References

Seoul Metropolitan Subway stations
Metro stations in Gangnam District
Railway stations opened in 2003